The 2021–22 Northwestern Wildcats women's basketball team represented Northwestern University during the 2021–22 NCAA Division I women's basketball season. The Wildcats were led by 14th-year head coach Joe McKeown. They played their home games at Welsh–Ryan Arena as members of the Big Ten Conference.

They finished the season 17–12, 8–8 in Big Ten play to finish in seventh place.  They received a bye into the Second Round of the Big Ten women's tournament where they defeated Minnesota before losing to eventual champions Iowa in the Quarterfinals.  They were not invited to the NCAA tournament or the WNIT.

Previous season 

The Wildcats finished the season 16–9, 11–7 in Big Ten play to finish in fifth place.  They received a bye into the Second Round of the Big Ten women's tournament where they defeated Illinois and Michigan before losing to eventual champions Maryland in the Semifinals.  They received an at-large bid to the NCAA tournament.  As the seven seed in the Alamo Regional they defeated ten seed  in the First Round before losing to two seed Louisville in the Second Round to end their season.

Roster

Schedule and results

Source:

|-
!colspan=6 style=| Exhibition

|-
!colspan=6 style=| Regular season

|-
!colspan=6 style= |Big Ten Women's Tournament

Rankings

The Coaches Poll did not release a Week 2 poll and the AP Poll did not release a poll after the NCAA Tournament.

References

Northwestern Wildcats women's basketball seasons
Northwestern
Northwestern
Northwestern